Irene Lardschneider (born 9 February 1998) is an Italian biathlete.

Career results

World Championships

References

External links

1998 births
Living people
Italian female biathletes
Sportspeople from Brixen
Biathletes at the 2016 Winter Youth Olympics